Hyponerita tipolis is a moth of the subfamily Arctiinae. It was described by Herbert Druce in 1896. It is found in Guatemala.

References

Phaegopterina
Moths described in 1896